James Alan Hartdegen  (born 1945) is an American Republican politician. He served in the Arizona House of Representatives from 1977 to 1991. He is a member of the board of the Central Arizona Project, representing Pinal County.

He was charged with corruption in the 1991 AzScam undercover sting operation, for accepting $440 over the contribution limit of $660, which forced his resignation.

References

Living people
Arizona Republicans
1945 births
Arizona politicians convicted of crimes